Gail Marjorie Brown ( Ziegler; born October 11, 1937) is an American former actress. She is best known for her role as Clarice Hobson on the NBC daytime soap opera Another World (1975–1986). She is the older sister of the late film actress Karen Black.

Early years
Brown was born Gail Ziegler and grew up in the Chicago suburb of Park Ridge, Illinois. She is a daughter of Elsie (née Reif), a writer, and Norman Arthur Ziegler, an engineer and businessman. Brown graduated from Maine Township High School East in 1955. Her younger sister was actress Karen Black. Before she became a professional entertainer, she worked as a hatcheck girl, a typist, and a waitress.

Career 
Brown left home for New York, planning to become a professional dancer. She became an understudy and dancer in a national touring company of Funny Girl. She also performed as Mimsey and as a showgirl in the Broadway production of that musical.

Brown played the role of Clarice Hobson on the soap opera Another World from 1975 to 1986 with sporadic on-off appearances following her departure. The role was notable for being the first comedic character on a daytime TV soap opera. In his book, Eight Years in Another World, head writer Harding Lemay stated that he intended the character of Clarice to last only two days, but he was so taken by Brown's performance that he decided to add the character to the storyline.

Personal
Brown took her professional name from her first husband, Michael Quinlan Brown, an actor and a writer. She was married to Brown from 1970 to 1977. Since 1981 Brown has been married to Gordon Duggan, with whom she has two children, a son and daughter. Brown has written and illustrated short children stories, other short stories, and has been writing throughout her whole life. She plays piano and some guitar.

References

External links

1937 births
Living people
American soap opera actresses
20th-century American actresses
American television actresses
American stage actresses
Broadway theatre people
Place of birth missing (living people)
21st-century American women